Graphidipus collaris is a species of geometer moth first described by Felder in 1875.

References

Moths described in 1875
Geometridae